Duncan Smith (born 17 May 1983) is an Irish Labour Party politician who has been a Teachta Dála (TD) for the Dublin Fingal constituency since the 2020 general election.

Political career
Smith was a member of Fingal County Council from 2014 to 2020. Smith contested the 2019 Dublin Fingal by-election, receiving 3,821 first preference votes (15.2% of the vote), but was not elected.

At the 2020 general election, Smith was elected as a TD for Dublin Fingal. After his election to the Dáil, James Humphreys was co-opted to Smith's seat on Fingal County Council. He was one of two TDs to nominate Alan Kelly for the position of Labour Party leader in the 2020 leadership election.

In 2021, Smith received media attention for criticising Michael and Danny Healy-Rae in the Dáil, after the two TDs had accused Labour of being "anti-worker" after proposing a zero-COVID strategy, accusing the Healy-Raes of coming from a background of "Fianna Fáil privilege and millions and millions of euros" and "pretending to be working class. He received praise from Miriam Lord for this, being dubbed a "working-class hero" in her column.

Smith was the Labour Party Director of Elections for Ivana Bacik in the 2021 Dublin Bay South by-election.

Personal life
Smith's father was a carpenter by profession. Smith studied at Dublin City University, completing a bachelors degree in business studies and a masters degree in International Security and Conflict Resolution. He is currently studying for a PhD in nuclear disarmament studies.

He is married and has one son.

References

External links
Labour profile

1983 births
Living people
Labour Party (Ireland) TDs
Members of the 33rd Dáil
Local councillors in Fingal
Alumni of Dublin City University